Kamal Abu-Deeb in Arabic (كمال أبو  ديب) (born 1942 in Safita, Syria) is Chair of Arabic at the University of London. He was a Leverhulme Trust Fellow.

Life
He graduated from Damascus University, Trinity College, Oxford, and St John's College, Oxford.

He edited the journal Mawakif with poet Adunis.

Works

 Adhabat al-Mutanabbi fi Suhbat Kamal Abu-Deeb wa al-'Aks bi al-'Aks, Al-Saqi Books, London & Beirut, 1996

References

External links
https://web.archive.org/web/20141006153820/http://www.ucl.ac.uk/mellon-program/seminars/2006-2007/abstracts/deeb.shtml
http://soas.academia.edu/Kamalabudeeb

Living people
1942 births
Alumni of Trinity College, Oxford
Syrian expatriates in the United Kingdom
Alumni of St John's College, Oxford
Damascus University alumni
Academics of the University of London